Quñuq P'ukru (Quechua quñuq warm, lukewarm, p'ukru gorge; ravine; gully; hollow; valley, "warm gorge", Hispanicized spelling Joñojpucro) is a mountain in the Cordillera Central in the Andes of Peru, about  high. It is situated in the Lima Region, Huarochirí Province, Chicla District.

References

Mountains of Peru
Mountains of Lima Region